R v Ladouceur, [1990] 1 S.C.R. 1257 is a leading decision of the Supreme Court of Canada on the constitutionality of random police traffic checks. The Court found that the random checks violated the right not to be arbitrarily detained or imprisoned under section 9 of the Canadian Charter of Rights and Freedoms. However, the violation was saved under section 1 as it was a valid form of deterrence for a pressing problem of traffic safety.

Background
Gerald Ladouceur was pulled over by the police as part of a random traffic check. The police discovered that he was driving with a suspended licence. He was convicted of driving without a licence.

Ladouceur challenged the provision of the Highway Traffic Act which authorized the police officers to do random traffic checks as a violation of sections 7, 8, and 9 of the Charter. The conviction was upheld on appeal.

Reasons of the court
Justice Cory, writing for the majority, upheld the conviction. He found that there was clearly a violation of section 9 as the basis for the stops were in the complete discretion of the police and entirely arbitrary. Furthermore, the consequences of failing to yield to the detention included severe penalties.

He found that the act of stopping drivers did not constitute a "search" or a "seizure" and so did not invoke section 8. Lastly, Cory refused to consider whether there was a violation of section 7, given that there was already a violation of section 9.

The violation of section 9 was justified as a reasonable limitation under section 1. The government successfully established that there was a pressing and substantial objective of increasing highway safety, and that random stops were an effective means of achieving the objective through deterrence. This position was further supported by evidence of its effectiveness in other countries as well.

See also
 List of Supreme Court of Canada cases (Dickson Court)

External links
 

Section Eight Charter case law
Section Seven Charter case law
Supreme Court of Canada cases
1990 in Canadian case law
Road transport in Canada